Dasychoproctis is a genus of moths in the subfamily Lymantriinae. The genus was described by Hering in 1926. Both species are found on Madagascar.

Species
Dasychoproctis dubiosa Hering, 1926
Dasychoproctis lasioma Collenette, 1959

References

Lymantriinae